The Churchill kimberlite field is a kimberlite field near Hudson Bay in Nunavut, Canada. It was formed during three magmatic events between 225 and 170 million years ago. The proposed source of volcanism has been the New England and Cape Verde hotspots.

See also
List of volcanoes in Canada
Volcanism in Canada

References

Diatremes of Nunavut
Triassic volcanism
Jurassic volcanism
Volcanic fields of Canada